Empire Fisher was a  trawler that was built as Herrlichkeit in 1922 by Reiherstieg Schiffswerfte & Maschinenfabrik, Hamburg, Germany for the Nordsee Deutsche Hochsee Fischerei Bremen-Cuxhaven AG. She was sold in 1948. Sold for scrapping in 1952, she was resold to Ireland and scrapped later that year.

Description
The ship was a trawler built in 1922 by Reiherstieg Schiffswerfte & Maschinenfabrik, Hamburg, Germany. She was yard number 549.

The engine was built by Reiherstieg Schiffswerfte & Maschinenfabrik. It drove a single screw propeller.

History
The ship was built by Reiherstieg Schiffswerfte & Maschinenfabrik, Hamburg in 1922 for the Nordsee Deutsche Hochsee Fischerei Bremen-Cuxhaven AG. She was launched on 29 June 1922. The Code Letters RCQV were allocated. Her port of registry was Cuxhaven. She was now , . With the change in Code Letters in 1934, Herrlichkeit was allocated the Code Letters DHLN.

On 13 January 1940, Herrlichkeit was captured by off Tromsø, Norway . She was taken under escort with the intention of putting into Aberdeen. Due to the poor condition of the ship, she was taken in tow by HMS Glasgow as the weather deteriorated and they put into Fraserburgh, Aberdeenshire on 17 January. Herrlichkeit arrived at Aberdeen on 21 January. Her crew were interned and the 80 tonnes of fish on board was sold. She was declared a prize of war. was passed to the MoWT and renamed Empire Fisher. The United Kingdom Official Number 167620 and Code Letters MJSL were allocated. She was placed under the management of H Markham Cook and her port of registry was London. The fishing registration LO 315 was allocated. By 1944, Empire Fisher was under the management of the Boston Deep Sea Fishery & Ice Co Ltd, Fleetwood, Lancashire.

Empire Fisher was sold on 3 February 1948 to the Hunter Fishing Co Ltd, Aberdeen and placed under the management of Robert Souza. On 26 February, she was registered at Leith, Lothian with the fishing registration LH 251. In 1950, management passed to George Hunter. Empire Fisher was laid up in 1952 at Granton, Edinburgh and stripped of usable parts. She was sold to the British Iron & Steel Corporation for scrapping, but was resold on 26 March 1952 to W J Sweeney, Achill Sound, County Mayo, Ireland. She was registered at Dublin with the fishing registration D 315. The ship was later scrapped by Haulbowline Industries Ltd Passage West, County Cork, Ireland.

References

1922 ships
Ships built in Hamburg
Trawlers
Steamships of Germany
Merchant ships of Germany
World War II merchant ships of Germany
Maritime incidents in January 1940
Captured ships
Empire ships
Ministry of War Transport ships
Steamships of the United Kingdom
Fishing vessels of the United Kingdom
Steamships of the Republic of Ireland
Merchant ships of the Republic of Ireland